Events from the year 2004 in South Korea.

Incumbents
 President: Roh Moo-hyun
 Prime Minister: 
 Goh Kun (until 25 May), 
 Lee Hae-chan (starting 30 May)

Events
 The organization Korean Lawyers for Public Interest and Human Rights is founded.
 April 15: 2004 South Korean legislative election
 June 1 The National Emergency Management Agency is formed.
 June 4: 41st Grand Bell Awards
 November 16: Love Land is opened.
 December: Online newspaper Daily NK is founded. 
 December 4: 2004 Mnet Asian Music Awards
 Miryang gang rape

Sport
 South Korea at the 2004 Summer Olympics
 South Korea at the 2004 Summer Paralympics
 2004 Asian Taekwondo Championships
 2004 World Single Distance Speed Skating Championships
 2004 K League
 2004 K2 League
 2004 Korean FA Cup
 2004 Korean League Cup
 2004 South Korea national football team season

Film
 List of South Korean films of 2004

Births
 February 9 – Yang Jung-won, singer (Enhypen)
 February 10 – Lee Gyu-baek, footballer
 March 5 – Choi Soo-in, child actress 
 March 11 – Jo Yeong-kwang, footballer
 May 25 – Jeong Jae-sang, footballer
 May 27 – You Young, figure skater
 May 31 – Kang Sang-yoon, footballer
 July 27 – Huening Bahiyyih, singer (Kep1er)
 August 31 – Jang Won-young, singer (Ive)
 September 28 – Park Jeong-woo, singer (Treasure)
 October 5 – Choi Kwon-soo, actor

Deaths
 June 22 - Kim Sun-il.

See also
2004 in South Korean music

References

 
South Korea
Years of the 21st century in South Korea
2000s in South Korea
South Korea